Dio Lequaglie (born October 12, 1963 in Civitavecchia) is a retired beach volleyball player from Italy. In 1993 he won the bronze medal at the first official European Championships in men's beach volleyball, partnering Andrea Ghiurghi.

Playing partners
 Piero Antonini
 Giuseppe Bua
 Fosco Cicola
 Enrico Corsetti
 Giovanni Errichiello
 Andrea Ghiurghi
 Riccardo Lione
 Gianni Mascagna
 Maurizio Pimponi
 Marco Solustri

References
 
 

1963 births
Living people
Italian beach volleyball players
Men's beach volleyball players